Hi-5 (also known as Hi-5 UK) is a British children's television programme, based on the Australian children's TV series of the same name, which was premiered on Cartoonito and CITV on 3 November 2008.

Format
Hi-5 is a variety-style series for preschoolers which features music as an integral part of its premise. The program features five presenters who are collectively known as Hi-5, and perform songs as a group as well as presenting individual segments.

The Puzzles and Patterns segment has a focus on logical thinking and mathematics, with a puppet named Jup Jup used as a tool for the presenter to complete puzzles or solve problems. The presenter of Body Move encourages children to participate in movement and dance, developing physical coordination and motor development. Linguistics and aural skills are at the centre of the Word Play segment, featuring a puppet named Chatterbox who assists in the exploration of language through stories and rhymes. Shapes in Space focuses on visual and spatial awareness, with the presenter exploring shapes, colour and everyday materials such as boxes and playdough. Musicality is explored through Making Music, with an emphasis on pitch, rhythm, beat, melody, and using a variety of real and pretend instruments. The final segment in which the cast comes together is entitled Sharing Stories, where a story is told that explores interpersonal relationships and emotions. The episodes are opened and bookended with a Song of the Week; a pop-style feature song which corresponds with the weekly theme and sets an educational topic for the week's episodes.

Cast

Presenters
 Chris Edgerley - Making Music
 Jenny Jones - Body Move
 Emma Nowell - Word Play
 Luke Roberts - Shapes in Space
 Cat Sandion - Puzzles and Patterns

Episodes

External links

2008 British television series debuts
2008 British television series endings
British educational television series
British television shows featuring puppetry
British preschool education television series
2000s preschool education television series
British children's musical groups
Cartoonito original programming
ITV children's television shows
British television series based on Australian television series